Charles Fagan was a state legislator in Alabama. He represented Montgomery County, Alabama in the Alabama House of Representatives. He lived in Montgomery, Alabama.

He joined fellow legislators in signing a memorial alleging abuses that occurred in Alabama.

His name is listed on a historical marker along with other African Americans who served in the Alabama legislature during the Reconstruction era.

See also
African-American officeholders during and following the Reconstruction era

References

Members of the Alabama House of Representatives
Politicians from Montgomery, Alabama
African-American state legislators in Alabama
19th-century American politicians
Year of birth missing
Year of death missing